Paul Philipp (born 21 October 1950) is a former Luxembourgian football player and manager.

He is the president of the Luxembourg Football Federation.

Club career
As a player, Philipp started his career at local club Avenir Beggen before moving to Belgium to play for 3 different teams in 13 seasons there. He finished his career back at Avenir in 1985.

International career
He made his debut for Luxembourg in 1968 and went on to earn 54 caps, scoring 4 goals. He played in 17 FIFA World Cup qualification matches.

Manager career
Philipp managed Avenir Beggen before managing the Luxembourgian national team between 1985 and 2001, during which time the team won three matches, all in the 1996 European Championship qualifying round, one of which was an upset win over the Czech Republic. The two other were against Malta, home and away.

Career statistics

International goals

Honours (as a player)
Luxembourg National Division: 2

 1969, 1984
Luxembourg Cup: 1

 1984

References

External links
 Player profile – Standard Liège
 

1950 births
Living people
Sportspeople from Luxembourg City
Luxembourgian footballers
Luxembourgian expatriate footballers
FC Avenir Beggen players
Royale Union Saint-Gilloise players
Standard Liège players
R. Charleroi S.C. players
Belgian Pro League players
Expatriate footballers in Belgium
Luxembourgian expatriate sportspeople in Belgium
Luxembourgian football managers
FC Avenir Beggen managers
Luxembourg national football team managers
Association football midfielders
Luxembourg international footballers